The gauge for the most of the China national railway network is standard gauge. Currently, in the national railway network, only the  Kunming–Haiphong railway uses narrow gauge. In addition, there are some industrial lines still using narrow gauge, mostly  narrow gauge or  narrow gauge. As of 2003, 600+ km narrow-gauge railways, 50000+ km standard gauge railways, and 9.4 km broad gauge railways were in use in mainland China.

Operational narrow-gauge railways

Kunming–Hekou Railway 

The  Kunming–Hekou railway (previously known as the "Sino-Vietnamese Railway") was part of the Kunming–Haiphong railway built by French colonists between Vietnam and China. Due to landslides and the opening of the new standard-gauge Kunming-Yuxi-Hekou railway, this meter-gauge line is now inoperative for passengers (except for a small section within Greater Kunming) but does have freight services.

This railway, opened in 1910, had a  gauge branch line from Caoba to Shiping which operated 0-10-0 tender locos built by Baldwin Locomotive Works. This branch has been later converted to 1,000 mm gauge as well, and presently (2016) is used by tourist excursion trains around Jianshui

The meter gauge section was originally administered in more or less the same way as the Indochinese networks, and it was physically possible for through trains to be run from Kunming to Saigon, as meter gauge was used in both these countries. During the Japanese occupation Japanese National Railways Class 9600 2-8-0 locomotives were shipped to aid their invasion. After the completion of the "death railway" in Thailand, it would have been possible for a time for through traffic to Burma (if not for a gap between Saigon and Phnom Penh, in Cambodia). This is now impossible as sections of this railway have been destroyed during the conflicts since World War II.

Industrial railways 

In Manchuria, lumber industries built narrow-gauge railways into the forests. These used Russian and Japanese locomotives, copied from Soviet or Eastern European designs. Now most of them have disappeared.

gauge railways 
Several  gauge railways were constructed by the Japanese.

Manchuria 
There were several  gauge military railways in Manchuria during the Russo-Japanese War. These Japanese military railways – which includes a section converted from the  Chinese Eastern Railway – used Japanese National Railways stock and were quickly converted back to standard gauge after the war to facilitate through traffic with the British controlled Peking-Mukden (Beijing-Shenyang) Railway, which was standard gauge. As a result, the South Manchurian Railway, a creation of the Japanese Kwantung Army, was standard gauge.

Hainan 

In 1941–43, during the Japanese occupation of Hainan, several  gauge rail lines were constructed in the western part of the island. Of particular importance for the Japanese war effort was the line connecting the iron ore mine in Shilu with the Basuo Harbor.

The lines fell into disrepair and were abandoned after the fall of Hainan to the Communists in April 1950. They were rebuilt  and converted to the standard gauge between the mid-1950s and 1985; now they form part of the Hainan Western Ring Railway.

Metre-gauge railways 
Metre-gauge railways were popular in China in several regions before the 1949 communist revolution. Several lines were constructed, with the intention to join all the railways, forming a new sphere of influence for the French which never materialized.

Kunming Hekou Railway 

The 466 km Chinese section of the French built Kunming–Haiphong railway, and a few surviving branches. The system also includes a short new meter-gauge connector to the new standard-gauge Hekou North Station.

Shijiazhuang to Taiyuan 
The railway from Shijiazhuang to Taiyuan (sometimes known as Zhengtai Railway) was opened at the turn of the 20th century. It was French and Belgian controlled, since it was a feeder of the Belgian controlled Jinghan railway.  To minimise costs, it was built to the same  of the Kunming–Hekou railway, with the hope that the latter could be extended to Shanxi province. The railway was built to the nature of a light railway and used rolling stock built in France and Belgium.

Datong to Pukou 

The Railway from Datong to Pukou (Tong Pu Railway), opened in 1933, which was funded by the Japanese and controlled by the Shanxi warlord, Yan Xishan, and which connected the Shijiazhuang–Taiyuan Railway at Taiyuan, had to be built to metre gauge as well.
The Datong–Pukou Railway  used rolling stock built by Japanese companies, even withdrawn old "Japanese National Railways" or "Imperial Taiwan Railway" stock (which is based on the  gauge Liu Mingchuan's railway' in Qing dynasty). When the Japanese invaded the Shanxi and Hebei provinces during the Sino-Japanese War, these two railways were converted to standard gauge.

Yunnan Burma Railway 

Construction of the  Yunnan Burma line started in 1941 but had to be aborted due to Japanese advances, and has never been completed.

Other 
In many rural or suburban areas, metre-gauge railways were built to transport agricultural produce. Such was the case of two light railways east of Pudong, Shanghai. They were isolated systems using small tank engines, like 4-4-2Ts. Later, experiments were made with gasoline railcar and trailer sets having Ford engines. They were closed in the 1950s and 1970s respectively and replaced by bus services.

gauge railways 
In many provinces  gauge light railways were used for mines and prominently in Henan and Sichuan they were used for rural transportation. Most of them were built in an era when most European light railways had started to dwindle in favour of roads. The Shibanxi Railway in Sichuan is being preserved as China's first heritage steam railway. The Bagou–Shixi Railway is still operating with steam locomotives, partly for heritage purposes.

gauge railways

gauge railways 
Sichuan Province
Hongbitan coalmine near Shenzhenjiao, main coal mine railway line.

gauge railways 
Sichuan Province
Coal mine (cable and hand tramming) at Shuangxianzi between Guanzhou and Meisuling.

Other

Arxan Forrest Railway

It ran during the 1950s and 1990s, carried wood, goods and passengers. Its highest speed is 60 km/h.

Xinyi Railway

Xinyi Railway was a 42.5 km–long branch line of the Beijing-Hankou Railway (now the Beijing–Guangzhou railway) located in Hebei. It was built in the winter of 1902 to allow the Empress Dowager Cixi to travel from Beijing to the Western Qing Tombs. Although the railway had no economic benefit, it was the first railway to be financed and built by the Chinese alone.

The empress dowager and the Guangxu Emperor fled to Xi'an in the aftermath of the Boxer Rebellion. After the Boxer Protocol was signed in September 1901, Cixi and the royal family made their way back from Xi'an to Beijing in December, taking a special train along the Lo-Han Railway (now also part of the Beijing–Guangzhou Railway) from Shijiazhuang to Beijing. To atone for the occupation of Beijing by the Eight-Nation Alliance, the Empress first visited the Eastern Qing Tombs in April. Afterward she intended to go to Western Qing Tombs. Because of the distance, she thought of traveling by train. The Empress then ordered Governor Yuan Shikai to construct a railway from Gaobeidian to Yi County, Hebei, within six months at a cost of tls. 600,000.

The Xinyi Railway headed west from Gaobeidian across two rivers. Yuan Shikai originally chose British engineer Claude W. Kinder to carry out the construction. Claude was the Kaiping Tramway's chief engineer, as well as the chief engineer of its extensions. Unexpectedly, this led to a French protest, so Yuan Shikai decided that the Chinese would carry out the construction themselves, appointing Jeme Tien Yow chief engineer on 19 October.

The project started in November and was completed by February 1903. The railway used old track and sleepers from the Guanneiwai Railway. On 5 April 1903, the empress and other members of the dynasty rode a special train from the Beijing Yongdingmen along the Beijing-Hankou line, then switching to the new track. The whole length was about 120 km, taking a little over two hours. The Empress was very pleased with the railway and train and gave the engineer a yellow jacket, flowers, feathers, and the title of prefect.

Cixi only used the railway once. The line was destroyed during the Second Sino-Japanese War, its track being used to repair other railways. Later, it was repaired and regauged during the Great Leap Forward. In the 1990s, it was renamed the Gaoyi Railway.

Chronological summary 

The following narrow gauge lines have been constructed in China (in chronological order, excluding Taiwan):

See also 
 Transport in the People's Republic of China

References

External links 
Steam railway photographs – China